Chester County is a county located in the U.S. state of Tennessee. As of the 2020 census, the population was 17,341. Its county seat is Henderson. The county was created in 1879 and organized in 1882. Chester County is included in the Jackson, TN Metropolitan Statistical Area.

History
Chester County was the last county formed in Tennessee, created by the General Assembly in 1875 from adjacent parts of neighboring Hardeman, Henderson, McNairy, and Madison counties. This land was used to create a county named Wisdom County, but "Wisdom County" was never organized, and in March 1879 the Assembly repealed this and created Chester County out of the same land.  Lawsuits by opponents of the creation of the new county delayed actual organization until 1882. Chester County was named for Colonel Robert I. Chester, a quartermaster in the War of 1812, an early postmaster in Jackson, and a federal marshal.

Geography

Adjacent Counties
Henderson County (northeast)
Hardin County (southeast)
McNairy County (south)
Hardeman County (southwest)
Madison County (northwest)

State protected areas
Chickasaw State Park
Chickasaw State Forest (part)

Demographics

2020 census

As of the 2020 United States census, there were 17,341 people, 6,060 households, and 4,471 families residing in the county.

2000 census
As of the census of 2000, there were 15,540 people, 5,660 households, and 4,199 families residing in the county.  The population density was 54 people per square mile (21 per km2).  There were 6,178 housing units at an average density of 21 per square mile (8 per km2).  The racial makeup of the county was 88.13% White (non-Hispanic), 10.03% Black or African American, 0.23% Native American, 0.23% Asian, 0.31% from other races, and 1.07% from two or more races.  0.97% of the population were Hispanic or Latino of any race.

As of 2000 there were 5,660 households, out of which 33.60% had children under the age of 18 living with them, 59.00% were married couples living together, 11.50% had a female householder with no husband present, and 25.80% were non-families. 22.60% of all households were made up of individuals, and 10.80% had someone living alone who was 65 years of age or older.  The average household size was 2.55 and the average family size was 2.97.

In the county, the population was spread out, with 24.20% under the age of 18, 14.40% from 18 to 24, 26.40% from 25 to 44, 21.40% from 45 to 64, and 13.60% who were 65 years of age or older.  The median age was 34 years. For every 100 females, there were 94.50 males.  For every 100 females age 18 and over, there were 90.20 males.

The median income for a household in the county was $34,349, and the median income for a family was $41,127. Males had a median income of $31,378 versus $21,615 for females. The per capita income for the county was $15,756.  About 11.10% of families and 14.40% of the population were below the poverty line, including 18.50% of those under age 18 and 15.30% of those age 65 or over.

Education
There are six schools in the Chester County School District. Chester County High School serves the whole county and holds grades 9–12. Chester County Junior High School holds grades 6 through 8 for the entire county. Chester County Middle School serves the whole county's students in grades 4 and 5. East Chester County Elementary School, West Chester County Elementary School, and Jacks Creek Elementary School all hold kindergarten through 3rd grade.

Henderson is the home of Freed-Hardeman University.

Communities

City
Henderson (County Seat)

Town
Enville (partial)
Finger (partial)
Milledgeville (partial)
Silerton (partial)

Unincorporated communities

Deanburg 
Hickory Corners 
Jacks Creek 
Masseyville 
Mifflin 
Montezuma
Sweet Lips 
Woodville

In popular culture
Country musician Eddy Arnold, a native of Henderson, titled his 1969 autobiography It's A Long Way From Chester County.
The 1973 movie Walking Tall was filmed in Henderson and elsewhere in Chester County, including important scenes filmed in the county courthouse; many local residents served as extras or played bit parts.

Politics
Chester County is a Republican stronghold. The last Democrat to carry the county was Jimmy Carter in 1976.

See also
 National Register of Historic Places listings in Chester County, Tennessee

References

External links

Official site
Chester County Tennessee Communities
Henderson-Chester County Chamber of Commerce
Chester County, TNGenWeb – genealogical resources

 
1882 establishments in Tennessee
Populated places established in 1882
Jackson metropolitan area, Tennessee
West Tennessee